Laini Taylor (born December 22, 1971) is an American young adult fantasy author and a finalist for the National Book Award in Young People's Literature, best known for the Daughter of Smoke and Bone series, Strange the Dreamer, and Muse of Nightmares.

Biography
Taylor was born in Chico, California, grew up as a US military kid in Europe and California, and earned her English degree from UC Berkeley. She currently lives in Portland, Oregon with her husband and daughter. She always wanted to be a writer, and was 35 before she finished her first novel.

Career 
In 2004, she wrote a graphic novel for Image Comics, illustrated by her husband, Jim Di Bartolo. Her first novel, Dreamdark: Blackbringer, was published in 2007. The sequel, Dreamdark: Silksinger, was a winner of the 2009 Cybil Award. In 2011, she published Daughter of Smoke and Bone, a young adult fantasy series. The first book in the series was chosen by Amazon as the Best Teen Book of 2011, and the sequel, Days of Blood and Starlight, was also on the list in 2012. In 2017, she published Strange the Dreamer, followed by its sequel Muse of Nightmares in 2018, in which protagonist Lazlo Strange, a scribe and polyglot, journeys to the Lost City of Weep. Taylor created a unique language for this world, which she weaves into the plot. Strange the Dreamer became a Michael L. Printz Honor Book as well as the 2018 Leslie Bradshaw Award for Young Adult Literature.

Works

Faeries of Dreamdark 
 Dreamdark: Blackbringer (2007)
 Dreamdark: Silksinger (2009)

Daughter of Smoke and Bone 
Daughter of Smoke and Bone (2011)
Days of Blood and Starlight (2012)
Dreams of Gods and Monsters (2014)
Night of Cake and Puppets (novella) (2013)

Strange the Dreamer 
Strange the Dreamer (2017)
Muse of Nightmares (2018)

Graphic novels 
 The Drowned, illustrated by Jim Di Bartolo (2004)

Collections 
 Lips Touch: Three Times (2009)
 "Spanking Robots" in Fractured Fables (2010)
 "Gentleman Send Phantoms" in Foretold: 14 Tales of Prophecy and Prediction (2012)
 "The Girl Who Woke the Dreamer" in My True Love Gave to Me: Twelve Holiday Stories(2014)

References

External links
 
 
 
 

Living people
1971 births
21st-century American novelists
American fantasy writers
American women novelists
People from Chico, California
University of California, Berkeley alumni
21st-century American women writers
Women science fiction and fantasy writers
Novelists from California